Hammarlund is a Swedish language habitational surname denoting a person originally living near a grove (Swedish: lund) on or near a cliff or crag (Old Norse: hamarr) and may refer to:
Gösta Hammarlund (1903–1987), Norwegian illustrator and journalist
Henning Hammarlund (1857–1922), Swedish watchmaker
Jan Hammarlund (born 1951), Swedish songwriter, musician and singer
Nestor Hammarlund (1888–1966), Swedish politician
Ole Hammarlund, Canadian politician
Pauline Hammarlund (born 1994), Swedish footballer

References 

Swedish-language surnames